Waylla Q'awa Aymara waylla Stipa obtusa, a kind of feather grass, q'awa little river, ditch, crevice, fissure, gap in the earth, "stipa brook" or "stipa ravine", also spelled Huaylla Khaua) is a mountain in the Andes of Bolivia, west of the Uyuni salt flat. It is situated in the Potosí Department, Daniel Campos Province, Llica Municipality, Canquella Canton.

See also
 Ch'alla Qullu
 Waylla
 List of mountains in the Andes

References 

Mountains of Potosí Department